France 4 is a French free-to-air television channel owned by France Télévisions, focused on children's programming. The colour of France 4 is purple.

Originally launched as Festival in 1996, the channel took its current name in 2005 when it became a free channel. The channel targets young audiences, and children during the day. In 2016, France 4 was refocused on family programming.

History

Festival (1996–2005) 
On 24 June 1996, France Télévision established Festival, a satellite channel for the TPS satellite service, which France Télévision co-owned at the time. Festival offered a selection of films and television series, many of them previously seen on France 2, France 3 and Arte.

France 4 (2001–present) 
In 2001, when the French digital terrestrial television system was in its developmental stage, the socialist government of Lionel Jospin asked the president of France Télévisions to consider a bouquet of public channels to be broadcast digitally, so that the public broadcaster could have involvement in this project. France Télévisions proposed the creation of three new channels: "France 1", "France 4" and "France 6", an all-news channel, a channel dedicated to the regions, and a channel featuring repeat broadcasts of France 2 and France 3.

Eventually, France Télévisions would have four digital channels besides France 2 and France 3, with three of them occupying existing channels: France 5 (formerly La Cinquième), Arte, and La Chaîne Parlementaire (a legislative channel); France 5 and Arte would switch from a combined service to two separate 24-hour services in the spring of 2005. France Télévisions thus only had space for one more new channel. The group eventually proposes the existing "Festival" to be the "new" channel. On 23 October 2002, the Audiovisual Superior Council authorised Festival to begin broadcasting in digital. France Télévisions planned for Festival to be renamed "France 8" (as it would have been the eighth television network in France) or "France Prime", but opted instead for France 4 after being allocated to channel 14. The newly created France 4 proposed to present a variety of entertainment, sports, fiction, cinema and series.

In July 2009, France 4 began broadcasting in 16:9. On 6 October 2011, France 4 launched its HD feed.

On 19 December 2009, France Télévisions launched Ludo, a new unique children's brand, to merge all former blocks Toowam (France 3), Les Zouzous (France 5, for preschoolers) and KD2A (France 2, the channel ceased to broadcast children shows). Ludo was broadcast on France 3 (focusing on generalist children's shows), France 5 (for preschoolers) and France 4 focused on more teenagers programs like 6teen, live-action shows and action shows, and broadcasts at middays and preevenings. Due to bad ratings, Ludo was removed from France 5 and France 4 on 25 June 2011: on France 5, it became Zouzous, and on France 4, the children's shows became broadcast without a branded block.

France 4 continued to broadcast cartoons only at mornings, and starting September 2013 until midday. These cartoons continued to target a teenager audience, with action shows (Code Lyoko, Wakfu, DC and Marvel cartoons), and sometimes more adult shows like Mad and Crash Canyon.

Reconversion to a hybrid channel (2014) 
On 31 March 2014, France 4 got a rebrand and started to timeshare most of its daily time with the Ludo and Zouzous blocks for children.

In evenings, it targeted a young adult audience, but in 2016, France 4 was refocused on family.

Closure plan
In June 2018, a proposal was issued to shut down France 4 as part of planned reforms of France Télévisions, with programming dispersed to France 3, France 5 and online platforms. The proposal was criticised by France's animation industry.

 was launched on 9 December 2019 as the new child brand of France Télévisions, a programming block broadcast all day on France 4 and as a separate online on-demand service. Programming and content for teens and young adults is instead available through France.tv Slash.

France 4 was originally planned to close on 9 August 2020, one day after the initially planned date for the closing ceremony of the 2020 Summer Olympics. However, in July 2020, just days before its planned closure, the French Government announced that the channel would continue to broadcast for another 12 months, whilst also pushing back the closure of France Ô by a month, as a result of the COVID-19 pandemic, which delayed the games to July 2021. France 4 carried school programming during the pandemic, which showed the utility of the channel.

From September 2020, the channel moved from being largely a children's entertainment channel, adding more educational programming for children and parents.

In January 2021, a report entitled "mission flash" was submitted to the National Assembly by two deputies in favor of safeguarding France 4, Béatrice Piron (LREM) and Maxime Minot (LR), who were charged with studying the offer for young people on public service television. This report judges that "a channel dedicated to youth is a valuable asset for public television" and takes up all the arguments of those who support the maintenance of France 4.

On the 18th that same month, French president Émmanuel Macron announced that France 4 will continue airing and will not close down as originally planned.

Audience share

Visual identity

Logos

Slogans 
 1996: "La chaîne des films de prestige"
 2005: "Le plaisir avant tout"
 2011: "Elle n'a pas fini de vous surprendre"
 2011: "Stimulant sans arômes artificiels"
 October 2012: "L'esprit positif"
 2014: "Ça déchaîne"

Culturebox 

Culturebox is an online brand of France Télévisions, focusing on cultural programming, including the arts, documentaries, cinema and music. Since 3 May 2021, it has operated as a programming block, timesharing with France 4, each day from around 8pm until 5am the next day.

The average number of viewers of the channel between February and April 2021 has been estimated at 25.6 million a month.

Brand history

Culturebox was initially launched as a website in October 2008 by France 3 as a cultural platform, offering on the internet a selection of subjects broadcast on the channel's national and regional news editions. On 19 June 2013, the website became the cultural platform of the France Télévisions group, changing its content to offering shows (theatre plays & concerts); some of which were broadcast live. In 2016, following the launch of the television channel France Info, a program devoted to cultural news was launched under the name of Culturebox, and presented by .

Broadcast 
On 1 February 2021 at 8:35pm, Culturebox was launched as a separate channel in mainland France taking the EPG position of France Ô, closed a few months before. The channel was available on channel 19 in terrestrial in mainland France only. France 4 and France Info were downgraded to SD to make room on the multiplex.

After this initial run ended, the Minister of Culture announced an extension of the channel as a time-share during the evenings on France 4, which returned to HD on terrestrial. Culturebox has been shown each evening, since 3 May 2021.

See also
 France Télévisions
 Culturebox
  (Children's programming block on France 3, France 4 and France 5)

References

External links

  

04
Television channels and stations established in 1996
1996 establishments in France
French-language television stations
Television stations in France
Children's television networks
Classic television networks